The Hague Convention on parental responsibility and protection of children, or Hague Convention 1996, officially Convention of 19 October 1996 on Jurisdiction, Applicable Law, Recognition, Enforcement and Co-operation in respect of Parental Responsibility and Measures for the Protection of Children or Hague Convention 1996 is a convention of the Hague Conference on Private International Law ("Hague Conference" or HCCH). It covers civil measures of protection concerning children, ranging from orders concerning parental responsibility and contact to public measures of protection or care, and from matters of representation to the protection of children's property. It is therefore much broader in scope than two earlier conventions of the HCCH on the subject.

The convention has uniform rules determining which country's authorities are competent to take the measures of protection. The Convention determines which country's laws are to be applied, and it provides for the recognition and enforcement of measures taken in one Contracting State in all other Contracting States. The co-operation provisions of the Convention provide the basic framework for the exchange of information and for the necessary degree of collaboration between administrative authorities in the Contracting States.

The Convention entered into force 1 January 2002 and as of October 2022 has 54 contracting States. Argentina, Canada, North Macedonia, the United States and Argentina have signed the convention, but have not ratified it.

Scope and application
The 1996 Convention aims to avoid orders about children's property and welfare (excluding parental responsibility and contact) being made in any state other than the state in which the child is habitually resident. It also allows orders made in the child's state of habitual residence to be registered and made enforceable in other Convention countries. It establishes a framework for the co-ordination of legal systems, and for international judicial and administrative co-operation.

General background

The Hague Children's Conventions

The Hague Conference has, for more than a century, been involved in measures of protection under civil law of children at risk in cross-frontier situations. Three Hague Children's Conventions have been developed over the last twenty-five years, a fundamental purpose being to provide the practical machinery to enable States which share a common interest in protecting children to co-operate together to do so.

The 1996 Convention
The 1996 Convention is the broadest in scope of those three, covering as it does a very wide range of civil measures of protection concerning children, ranging from public measures of protection or care to matters of representation to the protection of children's property. It also covers:

 Unaccompanied minors
 Cross-frontier placements of children

Implementation in the European Union 
The subject of the convention is one of the subjects treated in the EU's Brussels II regulations. Between member states this regulation takes precedence over the Hague Convention as it is "at least as favourable as the rules laid down in the Convention". The subjects of convention furthermore is an area of mixed competence between the European Union and its member states, which means that the European Union has to authorise it member states to sign and to ratify the convention and state so. The European Union authorised signature and ratification in 2002 and 2008 respectively.

The ratification directive was delayed as a result of the Gibraltar dispute between Spain and the United Kingdom. In January 2008 an agreement was reached to resolve the situation to allow progress on this and other treaties. Britain and Spain compromised on a so-called "post-boxing" system under which communications between Spain and Gibraltar involving the treaties will go through London. After this deal the Convention entered into force for several EU countries, including Spain and the United Kingdom. All EU member states have ratified the convention.

Implementation in the Russian Federation 

The 1996 Convention entered into force in Russia on 1 June 2013. The first use of the Convention in Russia, known as the Neustadt case, concerned the abduction of two minors by their non-custodial father from the United Kingdom to Russia.  The case was heard by the Moscow City Court in September 2013, which ruled to recognize and enforce English court orders for a return of the children to their mother in the United Kingdom.  The father appealed, but in November 2013 the Moscow City Court upheld their first ruling and the orders to return the children became final.  The order was not enforced until the end of June 2014 when Russian law enforcement officials found the children, who had been kept hidden by their father for over seven months since he lost his appeal.

External links
 Treaty text
Ratifications

References 

Treaties concluded in 1996
Treaties entered into force in 2002
Hague Conference on Private International Law conventions
Treaties of Albania
Treaties of Australia
Treaties of Austria
Treaties of Barbados
Treaties of Belgium
Treaties of Bulgaria
Treaties of Cape Verde
Treaties of Croatia
Treaties of Cyprus
Treaties of Cuba
Treaties of the Czech Republic
Treaties of Denmark
Treaties of Ecuador
Treaties of Estonia
Treaties of Finland
Treaties of Fiji
Treaties of France
Treaties of Georgia (country)
Treaties of Germany
Treaties of Greece
Treaties of Guyana
Treaties of Honduras
Treaties of Hungary
Treaties of Ireland
Treaties of Italy
Treaties of Latvia
Treaties of Lithuania
Treaties of Luxembourg
Treaties of Malta
Treaties of Monaco
Treaties of Montenegro
Treaties of Morocco
Treaties of the Netherlands
Treaties of Nicaragua
Treaties of Norway
Treaties of Paraguay
Treaties of Poland
Treaties of Portugal
Treaties of Romania
Treaties of Russia
Treaties of Serbia
Treaties of Slovakia
Treaties of Slovenia
Treaties of Spain
Treaties of Sweden
Treaties of Switzerland
Treaties of Turkey
Treaties of Ukraine
Treaties of the United Kingdom
Treaties of Uruguay
Treaties of the Dominican Republic
Treaties of Armenia
Treaties of Lesotho
Family law treaties
1996 in the Netherlands
Treaties extended to Curaçao
Treaties extended to the Caribbean Netherlands
Treaties extended to Gibraltar
Treaties extended to Greenland
20th century in The Hague
Parental responsibility (access and custody)